The Čobanija Bridge is an iron bridge, located in Sarajevo, Bosnia and Herzegovina,  which crosses the River Miljacka. It was erected in 1887. 

The bridge stands on a site previously occupied by a wooden bridge, known as the Šejhanija bridge, which had been built in the 16th century.

References

Bridges in Sarajevo